Rollin' with the Nines is a 2006 British film set mainly in South London, about a rap group turned drug dealers. The working film title was Proper Little Charlie.  The film stars Vas Blackwood, Robbie Gee, Mark Smith (Gladiator), Simon Webbe and Billy Murray. Small appearances are made by Jason Flemyng, Dizzee Rascal, Rodney P, Kano and Aisleyne Horgan-Wallace.

Plot
The movie begins with the UK Hip Hop group "Time Served" getting used to living the high life as rap stars. This all comes crashing down however when one of their members Too Fine is killed in a drive-by because he owes a drug dealer, Temper, money. On returning to her flat after the murder, Too Fine's sister Hope walks in on the same drug dealer looking for his money. After telling her she has two days left to pay or he is going to kill her family, he rapes her and leaves. While this is happening the other two members of the group, Rage and Finny find out that due to being signed as a three-man group, their contract is now void.

Under the premise of paying him back, Hope goes to Temper's house with a sawn-off shotgun. After killing him she goes back to Finny's. Knowing that Temper's two side-kicks, Chosen-one and Chronic, will come hunting for her, Finny, Rage and their friend Pushy decide to finish them off. Turning up at their favourite night-club, they kill the two, catching a waitress in the crossfire.

Hope is then contacted by big time crime lord David Brumby, who wants the money Temper owed him. She instead convinces him to work with her instead, and with Finny, Rage and Pushy, go into the drug dealing business. While this is going on, DS Andy White is on the case looking for the killers of the night club waitress.

White and his cohorts raid a Yardie drug-dealer and find out that Too Fine and Pushy are connected. Knowing this they begin tailing Pushy and his known affiliates, Rage and Finny. Noticing they are being followed on the way to a drug deal, they attempted to give their pursuers the shake. Finny although is captured after their cars rolls off the road and they attempt to get away on foot. In order to avoid going down for multiple offences (White also threatens to have him killed in his cell) he fingers everyone else involved.

The police round up everyone involved, including Rage, Pushy and Brumby, but not Hope. Knowing Finny is the grass, Pushy calls Hope, not fully believing him she hangs up on him. Finny then comes round to Hope's to get her to leave London with him. Now knowing the truth she stabs Finny, dumping his body in a car. With his only witness dead, White has to let Rage, Pushy and Brumby go. Thinking they have gotten off, Rage and Pushy go out to celebrate, but get gunned down in the car park of a pub by Brumby's men, on the orders of DS White, who says he'll turn a "blind eye" to Brumby now.

Characters
Finny (Vas Blackwood) - The front man of the group Time Served, he also used to be in an under-ground rap group beforehand. The other members of the group are killed in a drive by, and he later gets arrested for armed robbery.
Too Fine (Simon Webbe) - Before becoming successful in Time Served he used to be a drug dealer, and his unpaid street debts with Temper are what get him killed, and sparks off the whole movie's storyline.
Rage (Roffem Morgan) - Described as a "Nasty little bastard" he served time in a young offender's institute with Too Fine.
Pushy (Robbie Gee) - A friend of the group but not a member, at the start of the movie he is a small-time marijuana dealer, but joins in with Hope to start selling Brumby's drugs.
Hope (Naomi Taylor) - The sister of Too Fine, she convinces Brumby to go in with her after killing his main dealer Temper.
David Brumby (Billy Murray) - The main drug dealer at the top, he imports the drugs from Holland for Temper, and later Hope to sell. It is possible he is from Essex as DS White says to him, "You're a long fucking way from Essex boys".
DS Andy White (Terry Stone) - The anti-hero of the film, while he is a corrupt officer, who sells confiscated drugs on the side he is dedicated to helping the people that cannot help themselves. While his methods are questionable and extremely heavy-handed, he gets results. After failing to get the killers of the night-club waitress (stating he does not care about the drug dealers that were killed, just her) legally, he orders them killed by Brumby.
Beefy (Mark Smith (Gladiator)) - Corrupt bodyguard who is out for himself.

Awards
Won the Jury Prize at the Raindance Film Festival 2005
Nomination for Director Julian Gilbey at the 60th British Academy Film Awards for the Carl Foreman Award

Soundtrack

Track listing
 Ms. Dynamite & Akala : "Don't Do That" 
 Hyper Hitman & S. Dee : "Back Down" 
 Life & Rodney P : "Ghetto War Cry"
 Kano : "Buss Dat"
 JC, Major Yardie & Shabba D : "Streets"
 Shy Fx : "On The Run"
 Life, Skinnyman & Sway : "The Whole Nine"
 Northstar : "Rollin' with the Nines"
 Swiss : "Talk 2 Me"
 Camilla, Gemma Fox & Lady Fury : "Girls Gotta Do"
 Daze, Hyper Hitman & J2K : "Dutty Life"
 P.D.C : "Gangster"
 Dizzee Rascal & Klass A : "Money"
 Simon Webbe & UK Team : "2 Step"
 S Elle : "U Choose"
 Kano : "Ghetto Kid"
 Corey J, Gappy Ranks & Jagwa : "Make Way"
 Sizzla : "Rise to the Occasion"
 Sizzla : "Wrath"

References

External links

Black British mass media
Black British cinema
Black British films
British crime films
2006 films
British gangster films
Hood films
Films directed by Julian Gilbey
2000s English-language films
2000s American films
2000s British films